Brent Phillip LeCras (born 12 October 1981) is a former Australian rules football player who played in the Australian Football League for the Kangaroos. He was originally recruited from Cervantes.

After being drafted in 2003, LeCras played six matches for the Kangaroos between 2005 and 2006.

He returned to play for West Perth Football Club in the West Australian Football League. In total, he played 141 games and kicked 138 goals for the Falcons since making his debut in 2002. He received the 2003 Simpson Medal for best-on-ground in the WAFL Grand Final, and the 2009 Simpson Medal for his performance in the WAFL state game against the SANFL. He was selected in the 2011 WAFL state squad. He retired in 2012.

He is the brother of former West Coast Eagles player Mark LeCras. Their father, Peter LeCras, played for East Fremantle in the WAFL.

References

External links

WAFL Player Profile - WAFLOnline

1986 births
Living people
North Melbourne Football Club players
West Perth Football Club players
North Ballarat Football Club players
Australian rules footballers from Western Australia
People from the Wheatbelt (Western Australia)